Acrolepiopsis sapporensis (Asiatic onion leafminer) is a moth of the family Acrolepiidae. It is native to Asia, where it is found from China and Mongolia to Russia, Korea and Japan. It is an introduced species in Hawaii, where it was initially misidentified as Acrolepiopsis assectella.

The length of the forewings is 4.7–5 mm.

The larvae feed on Allium fistulosum, Allium cepa, Allium porrum, Allium odorum, Allium nipponicum and Allium schoenoprasum. The larvae attack the leaves but sometimes also the scape, bulb or seed capsule.

External links
Taxonomic review of the leek moth genus Acrolepiopsis (Lepidoptera: Acrolepiidae) in North America

Acrolepiidae
Moths of Japan
Moths described in 1931
Taxa named by Shōnen Matsumura